James William Haley (born September 22, 1943) was a Texas politician that was a member of the Texas House of Representatives for District 10, and was a member of the Texas Senate representing District 3. He was affiliated with the Democratic Party.

Personal life
Haley was born September 22, 1943, and is a native of Shelby County. He graduated with a degree in history and government from Texas Christian University. He also obtained a bachelor's degree in teaching from Stephen F. Austin State University. He taught for a total of twelve and a half years. He is a member of the Christian Church (Disciples of Christ) and resided near Austin, Texas. He died July 3, 2022 at the age of 78 years old.

Political career
Haley was sworn in on March 1, 1978, to represent District 4 in the Texas House of Representatives after the resignation of Roy Blake Sr. He continued to serve district 4 through January 11, 1983. Haley began to represent Texas House District 10 on January 11, 1983. In his tenure he was crucial in enacting several reforms to the Texas education system, he chaired the House Committee on Public Education in the 68th, 69th, and 70th legislatures. Additionally, he served on the House Committees on State Affairs and Financial Institutions. He served in the Texas House of Representatives 1978–1988. In 1989 Haley became a member of the Texas Senate representing District 3, he served through 1995. Haley throughout his political career was a Democrat.

Throughout Haleys political career serving in the Texas legislatures he was given several honors and awards.

References

1943 births
Living people
Texas Christian University alumni
Stephen F. Austin State University alumni
People from Shelby County, Texas
Democratic Party members of the Texas House of Representatives
Democratic Party Texas state senators